Rhinotropis is a small genus in the family Polygalaceae. It was separated as a genus from Polygala by J. Richard Abbott in 2011. It is native to the south and west of the United States (Arizona, California, Colorado, Nevada, New Mexico, Texas and Utah) and to Mexico.

Species
, Plants of the World Online accepted the following species:

Rhinotropis acanthoclada (A.Gray) J.R.Abbott
Rhinotropis californica (Nutt.) J.R.Abbott
Rhinotropis cornuta (Kellogg) J.R.Abbott
Rhinotropis desertorum (Brandegee) J.R.Abbott
Rhinotropis heterorhyncha (Barneby) J.R.Abbott
Rhinotropis intermontana (T.Wendt) J.R.Abbott
Rhinotropis lindheimeri (A.Gray) J.R.Abbott
Rhinotropis madrensis (T.Wendt) J.R.Abbott
Rhinotropis maravillasensis (Correll) J.R.Abbott
Rhinotropis minutifolia (Rose) J.R.Abbott
Rhinotropis nitida (Brandegee) J.R.Abbott
Rhinotropis nudata (Brandegee) J.R.Abbott
Rhinotropis parryi (A.W.Benn.) J.R.Abbott
Rhinotropis purpusii (Brandegee) J.R.Abbott
Rhinotropis rimulicola (Steyerm.) J.R.Abbott
Rhinotropis rusbyi (Greene) J.R.Abbott
Rhinotropis subspinosa (S.Watson) J.R.Abbott

References

Polygalaceae
Fabales genera
Flora of the Southwestern United States
Flora of the South-Central United States
Flora of Mexico